is the 10th single by Japanese entertainer Akina Nakamori. Written by Yōsui Inoue, the single was released on November 14, 1984, by Warner Pioneer through the Reprise label. It was also the lead single from her seventh studio album Bitter and Sweet.

Background 
Producer Yūzō Shimada was initially not impressed with the song when he listened to the demo version, but he changed his mind and approved it as a single when songwriter Inoue performed it with Nakamori in a live studio recording.

Inoue recorded "Kazari ja Nai no yo Namida wa" on his 1984 self-cover album 9.5 Carats. Nakamori has re-recorded the song for the 1995 compilation True Album Akina 95 Best and the 2002 self-cover compilation Utahime Double Decade. In 2002, she performed the song on the 54th Kōhaku Uta Gassen, making her first and final appearance on NHK's New Year's Eve special since 1988.

Chart performance 
"Kazari ja Nai no yo Namida wa" became Nakamori's sixth No. 1 on Oricon's weekly singles chart and sold over 624,800 copies.

Track listing 
All music is composed by Yōsui Inoue; all music is arranged by Mitsuo Hagita.

Charts

Cover versions 
 Yasuko Naitō covered the song on her 1988 cover album Songs II.
 The Nolans covered the song in English as "Tears" on their 1991 cover album Tidal Wave (Samishii Nettaigyo).
 Fukuyama Engineering Golden Oldies Band covered the song on their 2002 cove album The Golden Oldies.
 Shuichi "Ponta" Murakami featuring Kōji Kikkawa covered the song on the 2003 album My Pleasure: Featuring Greatest Musicians.
 Aya Shimazu covered the song on her 2005 album BS Nippon no Uta III.
 Hiromi Iwasaki covered the song on her 2008 cover album Dear Friends IV.
 Tokiko Kato covered the song on her 2008 cover album Songs: Uta ga Machi ni Nagareteita.
 GO!GO!7188 covered the song on their 2008 cover album Doranoana 2.
 Chage (with Aya Matsuura and Tairiku Sada) covered the song on his 2009 album Many Happy Returns.
 Yōko Kon covered the song on her 2013 album Konjaku Uta: Pinky to Otoko Uta.
 Megumi Mori covered the song on her 2013 cover album Re:Make1.
 Penicillin covered the song as the B-side of their 2013 single "Gensō Catharsis".
 Lisa Ono covered the song on her 2014 album Japao 3.
 Juju covered the song as the B-side of her 2015 single "What You Want".
 King Gnu covered the song on the 2019 various artists album Yōsui Inoue Tribute.
 Shō Kiryūin covered the song on his 2020 cover album Utatte Kiririnpa.
 Ms. Ooja covered the song on her 2022 cover album Nagashi Ooja 2: Vintage Song Covers.

References

External links 
 
 
 

1984 singles
1984 songs
Akina Nakamori songs
Japanese-language songs
Songs written by Yōsui Inoue
Warner Music Japan singles
Reprise Records singles
Oricon Weekly number-one singles